[
{
  "type": "ExternalData",
  "service": "geoshape",
  "ids": "Q42392,Q45833,Q57448,Q34800,Q43194",
"properties": 
       { "fill": "#000080",  
       "fill-opacity": 0.4,
       } 

}
] 

The Kuomintang Islamic insurgency was a continuation of the Chinese Civil War by Chinese Muslim nationalist Kuomintang Republic of China Army forces mainly in Northwest China, in the provinces of Gansu, Qinghai, Ningxia, and Xinjiang, and another insurgency in Yunnan.

Origin 
The majority of the insurgents were formal members of Ma Bufang's Republic of China Army (Ma clique). Several of them were prominent Generals, such as Ma Hushan, who had earlier fought against the Soviet Union in Xinjiang. Others had fought against the Japanese in the Second Sino-Japanese War, including Muslim General Ma Yuanxiang, who fought under the command of General Ma Biao and was wounded in action at the Battle of Huaiyang where the Japanese were defeated.

Ma Bufang, Ma Hushan, and the other leaders who led the revolt were all former National Revolutionary Army soldiers and Kuomintang members. Many of the Chinese Muslim insurgents were veterans of the Soviet invasion of Xinjiang, Sino-Tibetan War, the Second Sino-Japanese War, Ili Rebellion, and the Chinese Civil War. The Muslim insurgents were all Hui people, Salar people, or Dongxiang people.

When Ma Bufang fled after the Ningxia Campaign, he took over $50,000 in military funds and fled to Hong Kong.

Some Hui Muslim Generals and units from Ningxia, like Ma Hongbin, his son Ma Dunjing, and the 81st Muslim Corps, defected to the Communist People's Liberation Army and joined them. Many Muslim units in Xinjiang also defected to the Communists.

Han Youwen, an ethnic Salar Muslim, defected to the Communists in Xinjiang and joined the People's Liberation Army. Han Youwen served in the Chinese government until his death in 1998.

The Muslim General Ma Lin's eldest son Ma Burong defected to the Communists after 1949 and donated 10,000 yuan to support Chinese troops in the Korean War.Ma Lin was the uncle of Ma Bufang and Ma Burong was Ma Bufang's cousin.

Most former Kuomintang Muslim Generals, like Ma Bufang, Ma Hongkui, his son Ma Dunjing, Bai Chongxi, Ma Jiyuan, Ma Chengxiang and their families fled to Taiwan along with the Republic of China government or to other places like Egypt and the United States when the Communists defeated them. However Ma Bufang's subordinate officers who remained behind in Qinghai province were instructed to revolt against the PLA.

Ma Bufang and Ma Chengxiang's forces were stationed across Qinghai and Xinjiang along with Ospan Batyr's men, where were originally battling Soviet backed Uyghur rebels in the Ili Rebellion and the Mongols and Russians at the Battle of Baitag Bogd before the Communist victory in the Civil War and subsequent incorporation of Xinjiang into the People's Republic of China. The anti-separatist, pro-Kuomintang Uyghur Yulbars Khan fought a final action at the Battle of Yiwu before fleeing to Taiwan.

Conflict 
Pro-Nationalist (Kuomintang) Muslim forces were holding out in the northwest and Yunnan at the time of the Communist victory in 1949.

General Ma Bufang announced the start of the Kuomintang Islamic Insurgency in China, on January 9, 1950, when he was in Cairo, Egypt, saying that Chinese Muslims would never surrender to Communism and would fight a guerrilla war against the Communists. In 1951, Bai Chongxi made a speech to the entire Muslim world calling for a war against the Soviet Union, and Bai also called upon Muslims to avoid the Indian leader Jawaharlal Nehru, accusing him of being blind to Soviet imperialism. Bai also called Stalin an ogre and claimed he and Mao were engineering World War III. Ma Bufang continued to exert "influence" on the insurgent KMT Muslim leaders.

The CCP allowed Ma Bufang's loyalists to go free after taking them prisoner in their takeover of Qinghai, to demonstrate humane behaviour. When Ma Bufang's now free loyalists proceeded to take up arms and revolt, this move turned out to be a major blunder. Former Ma Bufang loyalist Salar fighters were led by Han Yimu, a Salar who had been an officer under Ma Bufang. Han led a revolt from 1951 to 1952 and continued to wage guerilla warfare until joining the major revolt of Salars and Qinghai (Amdo) Tibetans against collectivization in 1958, in which he was captured and executed. After a crackdown and restrictions on the Salar population due to the 1950s revolt, the CCP then lifted the restrictions and measures in the 1980s reforms, and then granted amnesty to the majority of the rebels who had been captured and imprisoned. The Qinghai Tibetans view the Tibetans of Central Tibet (Tibet proper, ruled by the Dalai Lamas from Lhasa) as distinct and different from themselves, and even take pride in the fact that they were not ruled by Lhasa ever since the collapse of the Tibetan Empire.

President Chiang Kai-shek continued to make contact with and support the Muslim insurgents in northwest China. Kuomintang planes dropped supplies and arms to the Muslims; there were 14,000 former Muslim troops of Kuomintang Muslim Generals Ma Bufang and Ma Hongkui who were supplied by the Kuomintang, and with U.S. Central Intelligence Agency support. They operated in the Amdo region of Tibet in 1952.

General Ma Hushan, a Kuomintang member and a Muslim, led an insurgency against the PLA from 1950 to 1954 using guerrilla tactics. Prior to this, he  had earlier fought against the Soviet Red Army. He was against the Marxist–Leninist indoctrination of the Communist Party, and he killed hundreds of PLA soldiers in guerrilla ambushes in valleys and mountains. He was captured in 1954 and executed at Lanzhou.

Ospan Batyr, a Turkic Kazakh who was on the Kuomintang payroll, fought for the Republic of China government against the Uyghurs, Mongols, and Russians, then against the Communist PLA invasion of Xinjiang. He was captured and executed in 1951.

Yulbars Khan, a Uyghur who worked for the Kuomintang, led a Chinese Hui Muslim cavalry against PLA forces taking over Xinjiang. In 1951, after most of his troops deserted and defected to the PLA, he fled to Calcutta in India via Tibet, where his men were attacked by the Dalai Lama's Tibetan forces. He managed to escape from the Dalai Lama's grip, and subsequently took a steamer to Taiwan. The Kuomintang government then appointed him Governor of Xinjiang, a title which he held until he died in the mid-1970s in Taiwan. His memoirs were published in 1969.

General Ma Liang, who was related to Ma Bufang, had 2,000 Chinese Muslim troops under his command around Gansu/Qinghai. Chiang Kai-shek sent agents in May 1952 to communicate with him, and Chiang offered him the post of Commander-in-chief of the 103rd Route of the Kuomintang army, which was accepted by Ma. The CIA dropped supplies such as ammunition, radios, and gold at Nagchuka to Ma Liang. Ma Yuanxiang was another Chinese Muslim General related to the Ma family. Ma Yuanxiang and Ma Liang wreaked havoc on the Communist forces. In 1953, Mao Zedong was compelled to take radical action against them. Ma Yuanxiang was then killed by the Communist forces in 1953.

Other insurgencies

Burma 

Another group of Kuomintang insurgents were in Burma. Many of them were Hui Muslims, like the insurgents in the northwest, but they did not coordinate their attacks with them.

After losing mainland China, a group of approximately 12,000 KMT soldiers escaped to Burma and continued launching guerrilla attacks into southern China. Their leader, General Li Mi, was paid a salary by the ROC government and given the nominal title of Governor of Yunnan. After the Burmese government appealed to the United Nations in 1953, the U.S. began pressuring the ROC to withdraw its loyalists. By the end of 1954, nearly 6,000 soldiers had left Burma and Li Mi declared his army disbanded. However, thousands remained, and the ROC continued to supply and command them, even secretly supplying reinforcements at times.

The Republic of China (Taiwan) Ministry of National Defence's Intelligence Bureau employed the pro-Kuomintang Yunnanese Muslim Maj. General Ma Chün-kuo to operate in Burma. General Ma became an important figure in the narcotics trade in the region. A guerrilla force led by him worked with General Li Mi's forces in Burma. Ma Shou-i, a Yunnanese Muslim mapang (militia) leader involved in smuggling and narcotics trafficking, assisted the Kuomintang forces under Li Mi with logistics, since the Communists adopted an anti narcotics policy. Forces under General Ma Chün-kuo conducted their first minor assault on Yunnan in April 1963, and various insignificant raids continued in the following years. General Ma himself admitted that they were not doing much. Most of General Ma's activities consisted of jade and opium smuggling, and not fighting, since there was only sporadic aid and few orders to do anything from Taiwan.

Chinese Hui Muslim merchants in Burma and Thailand assisted the Kuomintang forces in the Burmese opium trade.

Since the 1980s, thousands of Muslims from Myanmar and Thailand have migrated to Taiwan in search of a better life. They are descendants of nationalist soldiers that fled Yunnan when the communists took over mainland China.

Tibet 
After the insurgency was finished off, the PLA used Hui soldiers who had served under Ma Bufang to crush the Tibetan revolt in Amdo.

See also
Chinese Civil War
Campaign to Suppress Bandits in Northwestern China
Campaign at the China–Burma Border
Kuomintang in Burma

References 

Chinese Civil War
1950s in China
Islam in China
Islamic insurgency
Rebellions in China
Military history of Gansu
Military history of Qinghai
History of Ningxia
20th century in Xinjiang
Military history of Yunnan
Islam and violence
Wars involving the People's Republic of China
Wars involving the Republic of China
Conflicts in 1950
Conflicts in 1951
Conflicts in 1952
Conflicts in 1953
Conflicts in 1954
Conflicts in 1955
Conflicts in 1956
Conflicts in 1957
Conflicts in 1958
1950 in China
1951 in China
1952 in China
1953 in China
1954 in China
1955 in China
1956 in China
1957 in China
1958 in China
Violence against indigenous peoples